Nebria lafresnayei cantabrica is a subspecies of ground beetle in the Nebriinae subfamily that is endemic to Spain.

References

lafresnayei cantabrica
Beetles described in 1964
Beetles of Europe
Endemic fauna of Spain